Vivekananda Mahavidyalaya is a college in Bardhaman, Purba Bardhaman district, West Bengal, India. It offers undergraduate courses in arts, commerce and sciences and postgraduate in chemistry. It is affiliated with  University of Burdwan. It is a general degree college with postgraduate studies in chemistry.

History 
On the eve of Swami Vivekananda's Birthday Centenary in 4019, the District Magistrate of Burdwan, K.P.S. Menon, Chairman of Zila Parishad, Narayan Chowdhury and other citizens of Burdwan took initiatives to establish a new college.

Burdwan Municipality gifted a land in the name of the proposed college in Sarshe Danga Mouza, near Sadarghat. Prafulla Chandra Sen, then Chief Minister of West Bengal, laid the foundation stone on 8 March 1964. Menon served as President, Dr. Sailendranath Mukhopadhyaya was Vice President, and the Chief Engineer was Zila Parisad. Prafulla Kumar Pal was appointed the secretary to the committee.

Educationists raised a fund of nearly two lakh rupees for the college.

The college became a Government Sponsored College. On 26 August 1964, the college was inaugurated formally.

Departments

Science

Chemistry
Physics
Mathematics
Botany
Zoology
Economics
Statistics
Microbiology

Arts

Bengali
English
Sanskrit
History
Geography
Political Science
Philosophy
Economics
Education

Accreditation
The college is recognized by the University Grants Commission (UGC). It was re-accredited (2nd Cycle) by the National Assessment and Accreditation Council (NAAC) in 2016, and awarded B+ grade.

See also

References

External links
vmbdn.in

Colleges affiliated to University of Burdwan
Educational institutions established in 1964
Universities and colleges in Purba Bardhaman district
1964 establishments in West Bengal
Bardhaman